Justicia sarithroides is a plant native to the Cerrado vegetation of Brazil.

References
 This plant is part of the list of plants of Cerrado vegetation of Brazil

sarithroides
Flora of Brazil